Lotus Approach is a relational database management system included in IBM's Lotus SmartSuite for Microsoft Windows.

As a start-up company, Approach was formed in 1991 and won over 30 awards the first year, including "best of show" at Comdex.  The program was considered the first "end-user relational database" that did not introduce yet another file format.

Approach was sold to Lotus in 1994; Lotus was subsequently purchased by IBM.

See also 

 Comparison of office suites

External links 
Lotus Approach home page
Lotus SmartSuite home page
Approach User Support
IBM Fix list for SmartSuite for Windows 9.8 and fix packs

Desktop database application development tools
Approach
Approach
OS/2 software
Proprietary database management systems
Office suites for Windows